André Zwally (born 18 October 1955) is a retired Luxembourgian football striker.

References

1955 births
Living people
Luxembourgian footballers
Jeunesse Esch players
Association football forwards
Luxembourg international footballers